Oktwin, the principal town and administrative seat of Oktwin Township, in the Taungoo District in the Bago Region of Burma.

Notes

Township capitals of Myanmar
Populated places in Bago Region